The Surrey Fire and Rescue Service is the statutory fire and rescue service for the County of Surrey, England, with 25 fire stations. It comes under the administrative and legislative control of Surrey County Council, acting as the Fire Authority who fund the service by collecting a precept via council tax, and from central government funds, known as a grant settlement, and provide the political leadership for the service.

Surrey Fire and Rescue Service delivers prevention and protection to citizens against fires and many other life-threatening incidents as well as responding to all types of emergencies. It was established under the Fire and Rescue act, the Fire Safety Order and the Civil Contingencies act. It is part of Surrey County Council's Community Protection Group which includes other citizen focused services including trading standards, coronary service, emergency planning, military partnership, community resilience and corporate health and safety. The chief fire officer heads up the services that make up the Surrey Community Protection Group and is also the chairman of Surrey Local Resilience Forum.

Organisation
The region features several large urban areas such as Guildford, Redhill and Woking;  of motorway, and is in close proximity to the two largest airports in the United Kingdom: London Heathrow and London Gatwick.

A total of 25 fire stations are strategically located throughout the county. Twelve of which are crewed on a fully whole-time basis, with fire engine crews on duty at the fire station 24 hours a day; one fire station is crewed by whole-time and retained firefighters, and two fire stations operate on a day-crewed/retained basis - during the day fire appliances are crewed by whole-time firefighters operating from the station with retained on-call backup as and when required, whereas during the evening and at night the fire station operates on an entirely on-call retained basis with firefighters responding from home. Three stations are crewed solely on a day crewing basis from 7:00-19:00, however neighbouring stations cover the area at night. Seven fire stations are crewed solely on a retained on-call basis. All retained on-call firefighters must live within a five-minute drive of the fire station.

Historically, fire cover was set to national standards that were defined back in the 1930s but today are based on local risk.

Performance
In 2018/2019, every fire and rescue service in England and Wales was subjected to a statutory inspection by Her Majesty's Inspectorate of Constabulary and Fire & Rescue Services (HIMCFRS). Another cycle of inspections was carried out starting in 2021.The inspections investigate how well the service performs in each of three areas. On a scale of outstanding, good, requires improvement and inadequate, Surrey Fire and Rescue Service was rated as follows:

See also
 Fire services in the United Kingdom
 List of British firefighters killed in the line of duty
 Surrey Police
 South East Coast Ambulance Service
 SURSAR

References

External links
 
Surrey Fire and Rescue Service at HMICFRS

Fire and rescue services of England
Organisations based in Surrey